Christian Alberto Cueva Bravo (born 23 November 1991) is a Peruvian professional footballer who plays as an attacking midfielder for Alianza Lima on loan from Saudi club Al-Fateh, and the Peru national team.

Cueva was a member of the Peru national team that finished in third place at the 2015 Copa América and runners-up at the 2019 Copa América, also taking part at the Copa América Centenario, the 2018 FIFA World Cup and the 2021 Copa América.

Club career

Universidad San Martín
Born in Trujillo, Cueva started his career playing for amateurs Instituto Pedagógico Nacional Monterrico, at the age of 14. In August 2007, he played for a Huamachuco representative side in a friendly against Universidad San Martín, impressing enough to secure a subsequent move to the club's under-20 side.

On 12 April 2008, aged only 16, Cueva made his first team – and Torneo Descentralizado – debut, coming on as a second-half substitute in a 3–1 away loss against Universidad César Vallejo.

Cueva finished his first senior season with two goals in 18 appearances, as his side was crowned champions. He only became a regular starter for the side from the 2010 season onwards, and finished his spell at the club with 20 goals in 121 league appearances.

Universidad César Vallejo
On 3 August 2012, Cueva moved to fellow first division side César Vallejo. In November, however, his contract was rescinded by the club after a series of indiscipline problems.

Unión Española
On 24 January 2013, after being linked to a move to Ponte Preta, he was announced at Chilean Primera División side Unión Española.

Rayo Vallecano (loan)
On 13 August 2013, Cueva joined La Liga club Rayo Vallecano on a one-year loan deal.

On 1 March 2014, after being rarely used by manager Paco Jémez, Cueva was assigned to the reserves in Tercera División. On his debut for the B-team nine days later, he scored a hat-trick in a 3–2 defeat of Internacional de Madrid.

Alianza Lima
On 18 August 2014, free agent Cueva returned to his home country after agreeing to an 18-month contract with Alianza Lima. A regular starter during the 2014 Clausura Tournament, he was handed a six-match suspension after being sent off in a 1–0 loss to Real Garcilaso for the 2015 Apertura Tournament; the sentence was later reduced to three matches.

Toluca
On 18 July 2015, Cueva signed for Mexican club Toluca. He made his debut for the club on 29 July, replacing Diego Aguilar in a 4–3 home defeat of Necaxa, for the year's Copa Mexico.

São Paulo
On 2 June 2016, Cueva signed a four-year contract with Brazilian side São Paulo FC.

On 22 February 2017, Cueva extended his contract until 2021. However, he subsequently had multiple indiscipline problems, being fined twice and having a face off with teammate Rodrigo Caio due to the club's poor results.

Krasnodar

On 19 July 2018, Cueva signed a four-year contract with the Russian Premier League club FC Krasnodar.

Santos
On 7 February 2019, Cueva returned to Brazil after agreeing to a one-year loan deal with Santos FC, with an obligation to buy on a three-year contract on 31 January 2020, for an estimated fee of € 6 million.

Dispute and transfer issues
In September 2019, Cueva was caught fighting on a nightclub in Santos, being subsequently dropped from the first team squad. Santos president José Carlos Peres later requested the lining up of Cueva in a TV interview, which was later dismissed by the club's director of football Paulo Autuori.

Despite appearing on time for the 2020 pre-season, Cueva left Santos in late January, being later found in Argentina; in the meantime, Santos tried to negotiate the player San Lorenzo unsuccessfully. Cueva later attempted to rescind his contract with the club through FIFA, after alleging unpaid wages; he also reached an agreement with Pachuca.

On 14 February 2020, FIFA authorized Cueva to play for the Mexican club, while also authorizing Santos to charge for a restitution fee for his transfer.

Pachuca
On 15 February 2020, after FIFA's clearance, Pachuca announced the signing of Cueva.

Yeni Malatyaspor
In August 2020, Cueva moved to Turkish club Yeni Malatyaspor.

Al-Fateh
In January 2021, Cueva moved to Saudi Arabian club Al-Fateh. On 4 February 2021, he made his debut for Al-Fateh in a 4–1 away loss against Al-Ittihad.

International career

Cueva represented Peru at under-20 level in the 2011 South American Youth Championship. He made his full international debut on 1 June 2011, starting in a 0–0 draw against Japan, for the year's Kirin Cup.

Cueva was included in Peru's squad for the 2015 Copa América, and scored the team's opening goal of the tournament in a 2–1 loss to Brazil. He was an undisputed starter during the tournament, helping his side finish in the third place and being named one of the best midfielders of the competition.

Cueva was also named in Ricardo Gareca's squad for the Copa América Centenario, and scored the opening goal in an eventual 2–2 draw against Ecuador at University of Phoenix Stadium on 8 June 2016. However, in the quarter-finals against Colombia, the match went to a penalty shoot-out, and Cueva missed his spot kick as his side were eliminated 4–2 as a result of this. He was also a first-choice during the 2018 FIFA World Cup qualifiers, helping his side qualify to the final stage after a 36-year absence.

On 4 June 2018, Cueva was named in Peru's provisional 23-man squad for the World Cup in Russia.

Style of play
With Peru, Cueva usually plays in an offensive midfield role through the centre of the pitch, for his club sides, such as Toluca, he plays more frequently on the flank, mainly on the left wing. A good dribbler, he is known for his change of pace over short distances and his ability to manage himself well in tight spaces. His playing style has drawn comparisons with that of Brazilian playmaker Paulo Henrique Ganso, who plays for Sevilla, as Cueva occupies a similar function for São Paulo, in the way that he tends to move more through the pitch, making attacking runs into the rival area, scoring goals, and occasionally also helping out defensively by marking opponents. In his side's 4–0 victory against rivals Corinthians on 5 November 2016, Cueva demonstrated his great talent by netting a goal and providing three assists for his teammates David Neres, Chávez and Luiz Araújo.

Career statistics

Club

International

Scores and results list Peru's goal tally first, score column indicates score after each Cueva goal.

Honours

Individual
 Copa América Team of the Tournament: 2015
 Campeonato Paulista Team of the year: 2017

References

External links
  
 

1991 births
Living people
People from Trujillo, Peru
Peruvian footballers
Association football midfielders
Peru under-20 international footballers
Peruvian Primera División players
Club Deportivo Universidad de San Martín de Porres players
Club Deportivo Universidad César Vallejo footballers
Club Alianza Lima footballers
Chilean Primera División players
Unión Española footballers
La Liga players
Tercera División players
Rayo Vallecano players
Rayo Vallecano B players
C.F. Pachuca players
Deportivo Toluca F.C. players
Campeonato Brasileiro Série A players
São Paulo FC players
Santos FC players
Russian Premier League players
FC Krasnodar players
Yeni Malatyaspor footballers
Süper Lig players
Saudi Professional League players
Al-Fateh SC players
2015 Copa América players
Copa América Centenario players
2018 FIFA World Cup players
2019 Copa América players
2021 Copa América players
Peru international footballers
Peruvian expatriate footballers
Peruvian expatriate sportspeople in Chile
Peruvian expatriate sportspeople in Spain
Peruvian expatriate sportspeople in Mexico
Peruvian expatriate sportspeople in Brazil
Peruvian expatriate sportspeople in Russia
Peruvian expatriate sportspeople in Turkey
Peruvian expatriate sportspeople in Saudi Arabia
Expatriate footballers in Chile
Expatriate footballers in Spain
Expatriate footballers in Mexico
Expatriate footballers in Brazil
Expatriate footballers in Russia
Expatriate footballers in Turkey
Expatriate footballers in Saudi Arabia